Nososticta koolpinyah is a species of Australian damselfly in the family Platycnemididae,
commonly known as a Koolpinyah threadtail. 
It has only been found in the vicinity of Darwin and on Melville Island in Northern Territory, where it inhabits streams.

Nososticta koolpinyah is a small, slender damselfly; males are coloured black with greenish blue markings and greenish brown tinted wings, females are black with yellowish markings and clear wings.

Gallery

See also
 List of Odonata species of Australia

References 

Platycnemididae
Odonata of Australia
Insects of Australia
Endemic fauna of Australia
Taxa named by J.A.L. (Tony) Watson
Taxa named by Günther Theischinger
Insects described in 1984
Damselflies